Holt International Children's Services (HICS) is a faith-based humanitarian organization and adoption agency based in Eugene, Oregon, United States, known for international adoption and child welfare. The nonprofit works in thirteen countries, including: Cambodia, China, Colombia, Ethiopia, Haiti, India, Mongolia, Philippines, South Korea, Thailand, Uganda, Vietnam, and the United States. This work includes a range of services for children and families including efforts in nutrition, education, family strengthening, orphan care, foster care, family reunification, and child sponsorship. The organization's stated mission is to seek a world where every child has a loving and secure home.

History
In 1954, Harry (1904–1964) and Bertha Holt (1904–2000) were busy raising their six children on a farm near the small Willamette Valley city of Creswell. In addition to farming, Harry ran a lumber company. Bertha, trained as a nurse, was a homemaker and mother.

After seeing a documentary film about "G.I. babies" of the Korean War in orphanages in Korea, the Holts decided they would adopt some of the children who needed families. Harry began preparations to go to Korea, and Bertha asked a friend how to go about adopting eight children from another country. Learning that it would be possible only if both houses of Congress passed a law allowing it, Bertha Holt decided to push for such a law.

Two months later, the "Holt Bill" was passed, and in October 1955, Harry Holt and eight children arrived at Portland International Airport. The resulting publicity stirred interest among many families in the United States. The Holts set about helping others to adopt, leading to the creation of the foundation.

Awards
In the year 2000, Bertha Holt was awarded the Kellogg's Child Development Award from the World of Children Award for her work with the Holt International Children's Services.

See also
International adoption of South Korean children
Korean adoptee
Operation Babylift

References

External links
 Holt International Children's Services
 Bertha Holt's obituary from the New York Times

Adoption-related organizations
Non-profit organizations based in Oregon
Aftermath of the Korean War
1956 establishments in Oregon
International adoption
Adoption and religion
ko:홀트아동복지회